Laughlin Edward Waters Sr. (August 16, 1914 – June 3, 2002) was a United States district judge of the United States District Court for the Central District of California.

Education and career

Born in Los Angeles, California, Waters  received an Artium Baccalaureus degree from the University of California, Los Angeles in 1939 and was in the United States Army Infantry during World War II, from 1942 to 1945, achieving the rank of captain. A statue of him was erected in a French town his troops liberated, and he was mentioned in Stephen Ambrose's Citizen Soldiers. He was a deputy attorney general of the State of California from 1946 to 1947, receiving a Juris Doctor from the USC Gould School of Law in 1947. He was in private practice in Los Angeles from 1947 to 1953. He was a Republican member of the California State Assembly for the 58th district from 1947 to 1953. He was United States Attorney for the Southern District of California from 1953 to 1961, returning to private practice in Los Angeles from 1961 to 1976.

Federal judicial service

On April 26, 1976, Waters was nominated by President Gerald Ford to a seat on the United States District Court for the Central District of California vacated by Judge Jesse William Curtis Jr. Waters was confirmed by the United States Senate on May 11, 1976, and received his commission on May 12, 1976. He assumed senior status on July 6, 1986, serving in that capacity until his death on June 3, 2002, in Los Angeles.

References

Sources
 
 Laughlin E. Waters, Oral history interview, conducted 1987 by Carlos Vasquez for California State Archives State Government Oral History Program.

External links
Join California Laughlin E. Waters

1914 births
2002 deaths
Republican Party members of the California State Assembly
United States Attorneys for the Central District of California
Judges of the United States District Court for the Southern District of California
United States district court judges appointed by Gerald Ford
20th-century American judges
United States Army officers
USC Gould School of Law alumni
University of California, Los Angeles alumni
20th-century American politicians
United States Army personnel of World War II